Wilhelm Baur or Wilhelm Baur de Betaz (17 February 1883 in Metz – 26 May 1964 in Lindenfels) was a German Lieutenant General (Generalleutnant) of the Heer during Second World War.

Biography
Wilhelm Baur was born in Metz (February 17, 1883), in Alsace-Lorraine, which was then part of Germany. He joined the army at twenty years old. He served in the 61st Artillery Regiment, from 1903 until 1914. Baur was detached to the Military Technical Academy in 1909, before being detached to the War-Academy from 1912 to 1914. During the First World War, Baur served as a company-grade officer. He was awarded the Iron Cross.

At the beginning of the Second World War, Wilhelm Baur was appointed Chief of Staff of the Higher Flying-Training-Commander. In March 1940, he took command of the Special-Purpose-Combat-Group in Norway. In September 1940, he was appointed commander of the air district of Greifswald, then commander of the air district of Döberitz. Baur was promoted to the rank of major general (Generalmajor) in July 1941. In May 1942, Baur worked at the headquarters of the armies, with General Walther von Unruh. He was appointed Chief of the Defence Economy Staff, in  Norway.  Baur was promoted General Lieutenant (Generalleutnant) in August 1943. In September 1944, Wilhelm Baur was eventually placed in Führer-Reserve until the end of the war.

Staff positions
 Group-Director in the War-Scientific-Department, RLM (1 May 1937-07 Sep 1939)
 Chief of Staff of the Higher Flying-Training-Commander 4 (08 Sep 1939-28 Mar 1940)
 Commander of the Special-Purpose-Combat-Group (Norway) (29 Mar 1940-20 Sep 1940)
 Airport-Area-Commandant, Greifswald (21 Sep 1940-06 Feb 1941)
 Airport-Area-Commandant, Döberitz (07 Feb 1941-4 May 1942)
 Representative of the Luftwaffe in OKW, Special-Staff of General von Unruh (5 May 1942-31 Oct 1942)
 Chief of the Defence Economy Staff Norway (01 Nov 1942-30 Jun 1943)
 Field-Economics-Commander Norway (01 Jul 1943-30 Apr 1944)
 Higher Field-Economics-Officer with the Wehrmacht-Commander Norway (1 May 1944-18 Sep 1944)

Promotions
 Fähnrich (18 Oct 1903);
 Leutnant (24 Apr 1904);
 Oberleutnant (24 Jul 1912);
 Hauptmann (8 Nov 1914);
 Charakter als Major (8 Apr 1920);
 Oberstleutnant (1 Mar 1935);
 Oberst (1 Aug 1937);
 Generalmajor (1 Jul 1941);
 Generalleutnant (1 Aug 1943)

Decorations
 Knight's Cross of the Royal Prussian House Order of Hohenzollern with Swords
 Iron Cross (1914), 1st and 2nd classes
 Royal Prussian Plane Spotters badge
 Honour Cross for Combatants
 Wehrmacht Long Service Award, 4th to 2nd class
 Clasp to the Iron Cross
 German Cross in Silver

1883 births
1964 deaths
German Army personnel of World War I
Military personnel from Metz
People from Alsace-Lorraine
Lieutenant generals of the Luftwaffe
Prussian Army personnel
Recipients of the clasp to the Iron Cross, 1st class
Luftstreitkräfte personnel
Recipients of the German Cross
Recipients of the Iron Cross (1914), 1st class
Luftwaffe World War II generals